Casi casi is a 2006 Puerto Rican film written and directed by brothers Jaime and Tony Vallés. It was released in Puerto Rico in early 2007.

The film takes place in a Catholic school in Puerto Rico, where the main character, Emilio, is infatuated with Jacklynne, the most popular girl in school. In an attempt to impress her and win her over, he decides to run for Student Council President, only to discover that Jacklynne herself will be his adversary. Emilio then devises a plan, together with his friends, to rig the election and lose on purpose. However, they have to avoid being caught by the strict Principal Richardson (Marian Pabón).

Plot
Emilio is a shy and normal teenager, who somehow finds himself being sent to the principal's office every other week. He has a crush on Jacklynne, the most popular girl in school, so he decides to run for Student Council President in order to impress her. After announcing his candidacy, Emilio discovers, to his horror, that Jacklynne herself will be his opponent. Emotions fly high as campaign fever intensifies. After a poignant domino match, Emilio reasons that by sacrificing himself and losing the election, he would be able to win over her heart. Emilio devises a risky plan to rig the election in her favor, which includes sneaking into the school's computer lab to change the voting results, and simulating an electrical failure to divert potential suspicion.  The plan succeeds, and an encounter with the school's tyrannical principal is narrowly avoided. Immediately after changing the voting results, Emilio confronts Jacklynne and confesses his love for her, but she brushes past his confession, showing that she has no affection for him and rendering his efforts for naught. In an epilogue scene, after seeing Jacklynne freaking out in public, he decides that it was better she rejected him, and reveals that Maria is now his girlfriend. As the group is together in their car spending time together, the principal of the school pulls up next to them on a motorcycle with her boyfriend and having a completely changed appearance and demeanor. She throws them back a domino they had dropped before speeding off, leaving the entire group dumbfounded and gaping.

Cast
 Marian Pabón as Principal Richardson
 Ethan Mainewaring as Emilio
 Irene Lucio as María Eugenia
 Fernando Castro-Álvarez as Ángel
 Ricardo Arias as Alfredo
 Marisa Gómez as Natalia
 Alexis Arce as Mónica
 Maite Cantó as Jacklynne
 Manuel Benítez as Manolete
 Albert Rodriguez as Sr. Bismark
 Tino Garcia as Don Paco

Production
First-time directors, Jaime and Tony Vallés, had some experience working in theater. However, they had never made a movie before. They studied filmmaking through books and the Internet.

To make the film, they approached members of their own family, among them the Puerto Rican actress, Marian Pabón, and Mario Pabón. Most of the cast were inexperienced actors taken directly from school, in order to give a feeling of naturalness and spontaneity to the film.

The auditions for the teenage cast were held in three private schools in San Juan, Puerto Rico:
 Academia del Perpetuo Socorro (location of most of the film, and the film's directors' alma mater)
 Commonwealth High School
 Saint John's School

Some of the novice actors, like Ricardo Arias, had to be persuaded by the directors. The directors were forced to fill the role of María Eugenia with a replacement, Irene Lucio.

To minimize expenses, all of the cast had to provide their own wardrobe, except for the school uniform shirts.

Reviews
Despite being a low-budget film, it has received critical praise, including Ronnie Scheib from Variety magazine, and Joe Baltake, of the Philadelphia Film Festival, who compared it with Mean Girls and Clueless.

Awards
 San Diego Latino Film Festival - Audience Award
 Philadelphia Film Festival - Third Place
 Chicago Latino Film Festival - First Place
 New York International Latino Film Festival - Official Selection
 Vistas Film Festival - Official Selection
 Boston Latino Film Festival - Official Selection

See also
Cinema of Puerto Rico
List of films set in Puerto Rico

References

External links
 
 
Film Details at the Philadelphia Film Festival

2006 films
Puerto Rican films
2006 romantic comedy films
Puerto Rican teen films
Puerto Rican comedy films
2000s Spanish-language films
Films set in Puerto Rico